The 2013 Bonnaroo Music Festival was held June 13–16, 2013 in Manchester, Tennessee and marked the 12th time the festival has been held since its inception in 2002.

Line-up

Thursday, June 13
(artists listed from earliest to latest set times)

This Tent:
Futurebirds
Ariel Pink
Deap Vally
Japandroids
Alt-J
The Vaccines

That Tent:
 Nicki Bluhm & The Gramblers
Milo Greene
JD McPherson
HAIM
Django Django
Father John Misty
Allen Stone
ALO with Special Guests
The Other Tent:
The Stepkids
Twenty One Pilots
Araabmuzik
Walk the Moon
Purity Ring
Paper Diamond
Killer Mike
Bonnaroo Comedy Theatre hosted by IFC:
Maria Bamford featuring Kyle Dunnigan and Cristela Alonzo (2 sets)
Mike Birbiglia featuring Michael Che
Eric Andre, Nikki Glaser, Chris Gethard & Kyle Dunnigan
New Music On Tap Lounge brewed by Miller Lite:
Ri¢hie
Johnnyswim
Andrew Duhon
Sons of Fathers
Houndmouth
Maps & Atlases
Jonny Fritz
Wake Owl
Capital Cities
Silent Disco:
Vacationer (DJ Set)
Jonny Santos
DJ Logic
Sam Spiegel
DJ Jazzy Jeff
Solar Stage:
Asian Teacher Factory
In Memory of Gregor Barnum: Carbon Shredding
The Battleholex and Friends Hip Hop Variety Show Breakdancing
ON an ON
Ogya Afrobeat
The Flavor Savers Beard & Mustache Contest
Carnivalesque Entertainment: Bellydance & Vaudeville
Cinema Tent:
Sound City
Green Screens Presented by Rock The Earth: Revolution - Q&A with director Rob Stewart
Reno 911! Sheriff’s Department’s Bonnaroo Drug Safety Seminar with Lieutenant Jim Dangle and Deputy Travis Junior
 [adult swim] presents: things you've never seen
NBA Finals Game 4
The Polyphonic Spree perform the songs of The Rocky Horror Picture Show
The Rocky Horror Picture Show
Trapped in the Closet Sing-Along – Hosted by Henri Mazza
Leprechaun 20th Anniversary
National Lampoon’s Vacation 30th Anniversary

Friday, June 14
(artists listed from earliest to latest set times)

What Stage:
Trombone Shorty & Orleans Avenue
Local Natives
Passion Pit
Wilco
Paul McCartney
Which Stage:
Trixie Whitley
Jason Isbell and the 400 Unit
Of Monsters and Men
Grizzly Bear
Wu-Tang Clan
The xx
Pretty Lights
This Tent:
Sea Wolf
Calexico
Glen Hansard
Foals
Jim James
ZZ Top
Animal Collective
That Tent:
Bernhoft
Bombino
Fatoumata Diawara
Amadou & Mariam
John McLaughlin & The 4th Dimension
 Superjam with RZA, DJ Jazzy Jeff, Schoolboy Q, Solange, Chad Hugo, featuring Lettuce plus Special Guests
The Other Tent:
Reptar
Charli XCX
DIIV (played in place of Earl Sweatshirt)
Big K.R.I.T.
Conspirator
Wolfgang Gartner
Porter Robinson
Bonnaroo Comedy Theatre hosted by IFC:
Chris Gethard, Eric Andre, Nikki Glaser & Cristela Alonzo
Mike Birbiglia featuring Michael Che
Daniel Tosh featuring Jerrod Carmichael (2 sets)
New Music On Tap Lounge brewed by Miller Lite:
Alanna Royale
He's My Brother, She's My Sister
Rayland Baxter
Ryan Montbleau Band
NOCONA
Cloney
Ex-Cops
Casey Crescenzo
Matrimony
Luxury Liners
Cafe Where?:
Naia Kete
Jillette Johnson
Von Grey
ON an ON
Silent Disco:
Passion Pit (DJ Set)
Vacationer (DJ Set)
Atta Unsar
Y Luv (DJ Set)
DJ Logic
Jared Dietch
Sonic Stage:
The Stepkids
Jonny Fritz
ALO
Trombone Shorty & Orleans Avenue
Sea Wolf
Milo Greene
Nicki Bluhm & the Gramblers
Bombino
Calexico
Solar Stage:
Appalachian Flow Arts
Johnnyswim
Wake Owl (Performance & Interview)
Allen Stone
He's My Brother She's My Sister
John Oates (Performance & Interview)
The Battleholex and Friends Hip Hop Variety Show Breakdancing
TBD
The Flavor Savers Beard & Mustache Contest
Cinema Tent:
My Breakfast with Blassie – 30th Anniversary of infamous Andy Kaufman and Fred Blassie rendezvous at Denny's
Good Ol’ Freda – Documentary about longtime Beatles secretary and fan club president Freda Kelly
Sleepwalk with Me - Q&A with Mike Birbiglia
SYNCHRONIZE LIVE: The Road Warrior – Re-scored by DJ Thomas Golubić
“How to Make a Fun Music Video” – Q&A, Videos, and Live Commentary with Matt & Kim
An Evening with Pootie Tang – Introduction by Lance Crouther in character as “Pootie Tang”
 [adult swim] presents: Eric Andre – Q&A and selections from “The Eric Andre Show”
Green Screens Presented by Rock The Earth: Musicwood: The Documentary – Q&A with filmmakers Maxine Trump and Josh Granger
IFC Original Programming
Hell Baby – Q&A with writer/director/actors Thomas Lennon and Robert Ben Garant
Footloose Dance-Along Party – Hosted by Henri Mazza
The Beastmaster
The Goonies

Saturday, June 15
(artists listed from earliest to latest set times)

What Stage:
Gov't Mule
Nas
Björk
Jack Johnson
Which Stage:
Cults
Solange
Portugal. the Man
Cat Power
The Lumineers
R. Kelly

This Tent:
Patrick Watson
Lord Huron
Tallest Man on Earth
Dirty Projectors
Beach House
Preservation Hall Jazz Band
Rock n' Soul Dance Party Superjam featuring Jim James with John Oates, Zigaboo Modeliste, Preservation Hall Jazz Band
Bustle in Your Hedgerow

That Tent:
Matthew E. White (cancelled due to illness)
Two Gallants
Frank Turner and the Sleeping Souls
Drew Holcomb and the Neighbors
Dwight Yoakam
Billy Idol
Empire of the Sun
The Other Tent:
Clockwork
Death Grips
Four Tet
Matt & Kim
A-Trak
"Weird Al" Yankovic
Boys Noize
Bonnaroo Comedy Theatre hosted by IFC:
Michael Che, Nikki Glaser, Jared Logan, James Adomian
Ed Helms’ Whisky Sour Radio Hour
David Cross featuring James Adomian
Comedy Bang! Bang! with Scott Aukerman and Reggie Watts
New Music On Tap Lounge brewed by Miller Lite:
Ranch Ghost
James McCartney
Chris Stapleton
Daniel Romano & The Trilliums
Lucius
Stop Light Observations
SIMO
Bean
William Tyler
Mac DeMarco
Cafe Where?:
Peanut Butter Lovesicle
Tiny Victories
Kyng
The Revivalists
Silent Disco:
DJ Keebz
Sam Spiegel
Jared Dietch
MSSL CMMND
Sonic Stage:
Johnnyswim
Futurebirds
Rayland Baxter
JEFF the Brotherhood
Kalidescope Space Tribe
Ryan Montbleau Band
Patrick Watson
Lord Huron
Matrimony
Solar Stage:
Ryan Montbleau Band
Naia Kete
The Mowgli's
Preservation Hall Jazz Band
Very Special Guest (Performance & Interview)
Mawre African Drum & Dance
The Flavor Savers Beard & Mustache Contest
Carnivalesque Entertainment: Bellydance & Vaudeville
Cinema Tent:
David Lynch’s Meditation, Creativity, Peace – Group meditation and Q&A with The David Lynch Foundation’s executive director Bob Roth plus Complimentary David Lynch Signature Coffee and Donuts
Chris Gethard Presents: Reasons I’m Both Proud and Ashamed to Be On Public Access
SNEAK PEEK: AMC’s “Low Winter Sun” – Q&A with actors Mark Strong and Lennie James
An Afternoon with animator Don Hertzfeldt – It's Such A Beautiful Day and strange surprises
Crystal Fairy
Green Screens Presented by Rock The Earth: GMO OMG – Q&A with director Jeremy Seifert
LIVE PERFORMANCE: An Evening with Michael Winslow – Man of 10,000 Sound Effects
 [adult swim] presents things you've never seen
Evil Dead
Totally ‘80s Sing-Along – Hosted by Henri Mazza
Repo Man
Sixteen Candles

Sunday, June 16
(artists listed from earliest to latest set times)

What Stage:
Lee Fields & The Expressions
Macklemore & Ryan Lewis
Kendrick Lamar
The National
Tom Petty and the Heartbreakers

Which Stage:
Kacey Musgraves
Delta Rae
The Sheepdogs
Edward Sharpe and the Magnetic Zeros
David Byrne & St. Vincent
This Tent:
The Rubens
JEFF the Brotherhood
Baroness
Swans
Divine Fits
That Tent:
Aoife O'Donovan
John Fullbright
Black Prairie
Noam Pikelny & Friends
Sam Bush & Del McCoury
Ed Helms' Bluegrass Situation Superjam with Special Guests
The Other Tent:
Action Bronson
Wild Nothing
Holy Ghost!
Tame Impala
A$AP Rocky
Bonnaroo Comedy Theatre hosted by IFC:
David Cross featuring James Adomian
Bob Saget featuring Jared Logan & Improved Shakespeare Company (2 sets)
New Music On Tap Lounge brewed by Miller Lite:
Staying for the Weekend
LiL iFFy
Cat Martino
Alice & The Glass Lake
The Mowgli's
Milow
Royal Thunder
Cafe Where?:
Bri Heart featuring Jervy Hou
Little Red Lung
White Lung
Silent Disco:
DJ Keebz
Sonic Stage:
ItsTheReal
John Oates
Lucius
Mac Demarco
Aoife O'Donovan
The Revivalists
Delta Rae
The Sheepdogs
Surprise Set
Solar Stage:
The Revivalists (Performance & Interview)
Very Special Guest (Interview)
Beans on Toast (Performance & Interview)
John Fullbright
Black Prairie (Performance & Interview)
The Battleholex and Friends Hip Hop Variety Show Breakdancing
Cinema Tent:
Celebrate Father’s Day with Selleck, Guttenberg and Danson: Three Men and a Baby
Muscle Shoals
Mistaken For Strangers (The National documentary) – Introduction by Matt Berninger from The National
Green Screens Presented by Rock The Earth: Bidder 70 – Introduction by Alex Ebert of Edward Sharpe and the Magnetic Zeros and Q&A with film editor Ryan Suffern
The Way, Way Back – Q&A with writer/directors Jim Rash and Nat Faxon
 [adult swim] presents things you've never seen
NBA Finals Game 5

External links
Official website

Bonnaroo Music Festival by year
2013 in American music
2013 music festivals
Bonnaroo
2013 in Tennessee